Dunhua (Chosŏn'gŭl: 돈화; Hangul: 둔화) is a county-level city of the Yanbian Korean Autonomous Prefecture in southeastern Jilin province, People's Republic of China. It has more than 480,000 inhabitants (as of 2002) and was the capital of Balhae between 742 and 756, known at the time as "Junggyeong". During the Qing dynasty it was called Áodōng in Chinese and Odoli in Manchu.

Geography and climate
Its total area of  makes it, by area, the largest county-level city of the province.

Dunhua has a four-season, monsoon-influenced, humid continental climate (Köppen Dwb), with long, very cold winters, and short, but warm, humid summers. Spring and autumn constitute very short transitions with some, but usually not heavy, rainfall.

Administrative divisions
Dunhua has four subdistricts, 11 towns, and five townships.

Subdistricts:
Minzhu Subdistrict (民主街道 / 민주가도), Bohai Subdistrict (渤海街道 / 발해가도), Shengli Subdistrict (胜利街道 / 승리가도), Danjiang Subdistrict (丹江街道 / 단강가도)

Towns:
Dashitou (大石头镇 / 대석두진), Huangnihe (黄泥河镇 / 황니하진), Guandi (官地镇 / 관지진), Shaheyan (沙河沿镇 / 사하연진), Qiuligou (秋梨沟镇 / 추리구진), Aegmog (额穆镇 / 액목진), Xianru (贤儒镇 / 현유진), Dapuchaihe (大蒲柴河镇 / 대포채하진), Yanminghu (雁鸣湖镇 / 안명호진), Jiangyuan (江源镇 / 강원진), Jiangnan (江南镇 / 강남진)

Townships:
Daqiao Township (大桥乡 / 대교향), Heishi Township (黑石乡 / 흑석향), Qinggouzi Township (青沟子乡 / 청구자향), Hanzhang Township (翰章乡 / 한장향), Hongshi Township (红石乡 / 홍석향)

Sister cities
 * Dongjak-gu, Seoul of South Korea (1968)

References

External links

 
Cities in Yanbian
County-level divisions of Jilin